Antoine de Balinghem (1571–1630) was a Belgian Jesuit. He was born at Saint-Omer in 1571 and died in Lille on 24 January 1630.

References

External links
 

1571 births
1630 deaths
17th-century French writers
17th-century French male writers
Jesuits of the Spanish Netherlands
People from Saint-Omer